The Wrecking Crew is a 1968 American spy comedy film directed by Phil Karlson and starring Dean Martin as Matt Helm, along with Elke Sommer, Sharon Tate, Nancy Kwan, Nigel Green, and Tina Louise. It is the fourth and final film in the Matt Helm series, and is loosely based on the 1960 novel of the same name by Donald Hamilton. The film opened in Canada in December 1968 before premiering in the United States in February 1969.

It was Tate's last film released before her death in 1969. It was also the Hollywood film debut for two future action movie stars: Bruce Lee, who worked behind the scenes as an action choreographer, and Chuck Norris, who made his film debut in a small role.

Plot
Matt Helm is assigned by his secret agency, ICE, to bring down an evil count named Contini, who is trying to collapse the world economy by stealing a billion dollars in gold. Helm travels to Copenhagen, where he is given a guide, Freya Carlson, a beautiful but bumbling woman from a Danish tourism bureau.

A pair of Contini's accomplices, the seductive Linka Karensky and Wen Yurang, each attempt to foil Helm's plans. The former is killed in an ambush intended for Helm, the latter in an explosion. On each occasion, Freya's clumsy attempts to assist Matt are helpful, but not particularly appreciated.

McDonald, his chief at ICE, turns up to aid Helm, but is wounded in action. McDonald confides to Helm that the seemingly inept Freya is actually a top-secret British agent herself, using a clever guise. They go to Contini's chateau for a showdown, and Helm creates chaos and destruction with a variety of unique gadgets. Contini escapes with the gold on a train bound for Luxembourg, but Helm and Freya are able to catch up to him in a minihelicopter. Freya is almost killed by Contini, but Helm rescues her, then kills Contini by throwing him through a trap door onto the railroad tracks. Successful and alone at last, Helm finally has an opportunity to thank an appreciative Freya as only he can.

Cast

The film featured a number of wrestlers, boxers, and karate experts in small or uncredited roles, including Wilhelm von Homburg, Pepper Martin, Joe Gray, Joe Lewis, Ed Parker and – in his first screen role – Chuck Norris (background player in the House of 7 Joys scene). Bruce Lee does not appear in the film, but receives a production credit as "Karate advisor" (action choreographer) for the fight scenes.

The Wrecking Crew was Tate's last film released before her murder in August 1969.

Production
The film is the first in the series to not be written or co-written by regular screenwriter Herbert Baker, who was working on Irving Allen's more serious spy film Hammerhead. The screenplay was written by former police reporter and crime novel author William P. McGivern.

Helm's chief at ICE, MacDonald, is played by John Larch in this film, replacing James Gregory, who played the role in the other three films. Gregory said in an interview in Filmfax magazine that he was sent a reduced amount for his fee in the film. He was told that the film was reducing its budget, and Gregory refused to take the lower fee.

Bruce Lee, who worked on set as an action choreographer, remarked that he "tried to teach Dean Martin how to kick but he was too lazy and too clumsy" and that they had to mostly rely on stand-in Mike Stone. Lee stated that Sharon Tate and Nancy Kwan were better, "doing sidekicks pretty good with just a minimum of teaching". Lee said that Kwan approached him to become her private long-term teacher but he told her that she wouldn't be able to afford him.  

The Wrecking Crew is the only film in the series not to feature Helm's secretary, Lovey Kravesit, played by Beverly Adams, who was also appearing in Hammerhead. It is also the only movie in the series not to feature the villainous group BIG O.

Principal photography took place in California, with locations including Palm Springs, Idyllwild, and the Walt Disney Ranch.

Music
Hugo Montenegro who wrote the score for The Ambushers returned to compose the score. Mack David and Frank DeVol wrote the theme song played over the opening and end credits, "House of Seven Joys", which was the working title of the film.

Reception

Box office
In the United States and Canada, the film earned  in theatrical rentals.

Legacy
The film ends with the announcement of a fifth Matt Helm entry, The Ravagers (which would have been based upon Hamilton's 1964 novel of the same title). However, Martin declined to return for another film in despair over the murder of Tate six months after the film's release. When Martin refused to make The Ravagers, Columbia held up Martin's share of the profits from the second Matt Helm film, Murderers' Row. The project was then cancelled.

Several years later, a Matt Helm TV series featuring Tony Franciosa was attempted, with Helm now a private detective.

The Wrecking Crew was Tate's last film released before her death in August 1969. It was also the Hollywood debut for two future action movie stars: Bruce Lee, who worked behind the scenes as an action choreographer, and Chuck Norris, who made his film debut in a small role.

In 2019, the film is referenced and briefly seen in Quentin Tarantino's Once Upon a Time in Hollywood, in which Tate (played by Margot Robbie) is shown enjoying the film at the Fox Bruin Theater.

The first name of Kwan's character is Yurang. The real Yu Rang was a chinese assassin during the Spring and Autumn period.

References

External links
 
 

1960s action comedy films
1960s spy comedy films
1968 comedy films
1968 films
American action comedy films
American sequel films
American spy comedy films
Columbia Pictures films
Films based on American novels
Films directed by Phil Karlson
Films scored by Hugo Montenegro
Films set in Copenhagen
Films set in London
Films shot in California
Films shot in Los Angeles County, California
1960s English-language films
1960s American films